Up Against It is the fifth album by West London post punk and indie band The Times released in 1986.<ref name="Discogs.com">[http://www.discogs.com/Times-Up-Against-It/release/2012590 The Times on Discogs.com]</ref>

Track listingUp Against ItLast Tango For OneBoys About TownGarden In The Moonlight (Love Theme For McTurk And Rowena)WPC BoonMost Modern Woman In The WorldJacks RevolutionLadies Of The CauseMutiny In The British EmpireEscape!She's A ProfessionalIt's Cabaret Time!The WarThe Wedding Song''

Personnel
 John East (bass, vocals)
 Paul Damien (drums, vocals)
 Edward Ball (vocals, guitar)

References

The Times (band) albums
1986 albums